Alexander Gerald van Hoogenhouck-Tulleken and Christoffer Rodolphe van Hoogenhouck-Tulleken (born 18 August 1978), known as "Dr. Xand" and "Dr. Chris", are British doctors, television presenters and identical twin brothers. They are best known for presenting the children's series Operation Ouch! Chris has become well known for his two-part television special for BBC One entitled The Doctor Who Gave Up Drugs. Xand has also presented shows without his brother.

Family and early life
Chris and Xand van Tulleken were born to Anthony van Tulleken, an industrial designer, and his wife Kit, a publisher. Their younger brother is the film director Jonathan van Tulleken.

They are descended from Dutch Rear-Admiral  (1762–1851; originally Jan , of a family traced back to the fifteenth century, who changed his name in 1822 and was raised to the nobility in 1842 with the rank of Jonkheer).

The van Tulleken twins were educated at Hill House preparatory school, then King's College School, an independent day school for boys in Wimbledon, southwest London, followed by St Peter's College (Chris) and Somerville College (Xand) at the University of Oxford.

Life and career
Both Chris and Xand van Tulleken presented Channel 4's Medicine Men go Wild, and BBC Two's Trust Me, I'm A Doctor alongside Michael Mosley. Chris was the expedition doctor for BBC Two's Operation Iceberg, and has appeared in Top Dogs: Adventures in War, Sea and Ice (BBC 2), Holiday Hit Squad (BBC One), Museum of Life (BBC Two), The Secret Life of Twins (BBC One), as well as Celebrity Mastermind and The Wright Stuff. Chris was also doctor to a team led by Bruce Parry which recreated the 1911 race to the South Pole in the BBC documentary Blizzard: Race to the Pole. The brothers presented What's The Right Diet for You? A Horizon Special.

Chris van Tulleken was named as an emerging British talent in 'The Brit List 2013' by ShortList magazine.

In 2015, the pair presented another Horizon episode, titled Is Binge Drinking Really That Bad?, in which Chris and his identical twin brother Xand tested the effects of drinking moderate amounts of alcohol daily (Chris) and bingeing weekly (Xand).

Chris and Xand appeared on Series 5 of Hacker Time.

In 2016, alarmed by the steep rise in prescription medicine in Britain and dubious as to its efficacy, Chris completed a television show for BBC One called The Doctor Who Gave Up Drugs. It was a two-part social experiment in which he aimed to take over part of a GP surgery and attempt to find practical ways to treat patients and stop patients' prescription pills.

In January–February 2019, they presented a documentary series called The Twinstitute, repeated in 2020.

Personal life
It was revealed in an episode of Operation Ouch! (Series 6, episode 9) that Chris van Tulleken has a wife and a daughter. His wife Dinah gave birth to a second daughter in June 2020.

In a 2016 episode of Horizon titled How to Find Love Online, Xand stated that he was single and a user of online dating. He has a son from a previous relationship.

Humanitarian aid
Until February 2018, Alexander and Christoffer were Patrons and board members of the medical aid and healthcare charity Doctors of the World UK, which is a member of the international Médecins du Monde network. In 2015, Alexander and Christoffer ran the London Marathon for Doctors of the World, raising over £3,400.

Xand van Tulleken was a patron of the medical aid organisation Medical Emergency Relief International (Merlin), which merged with Save the Children in 2013, and reported for BBC Two in the aftermath of Cyclone Nargis, Burma, in 2008.

References

External links

1978 births
Living people
Alumni of Somerville College, Oxford
Alumni of St Peter's College, Oxford
Alumni of the London School of Hygiene & Tropical Medicine
British identical twins
British television presenters
People educated at King's College School, London